Sara Feigenholtz (born December 11, 1956) is a Democratic member of the Illinois Senate who has represented the 6th District since 2020.  The District includes the lakefront neighborhoods of Lake View, Lincoln Park, Buena Park and the Near North Side in the city of Chicago.

Previously, she served thirteen terms in the Illinois House of Representatives.

Background
Sara Feigenholtz's political interests and activity, notably in the areas of adoption, women's issues and health care, reflect her personal experience and family background. Her adoptive mother, Florence Buky, an immigrant from Białystok, Poland, worked her way through medical school to become an obstetrician. Many of Dr. Buky's patients were unable to care for their children and this was how she came to adopt Sara and her brother.  Feigenholz attributes the origin of her political commitment to health care as a basic right to the childhood experience of patients calling to see Dr. Buky at the family home in Lake View, Chicago, and her mother never turning anyone away, even those unable to pay.

Feigenholtz earned her bachelor's degree in political science and speech and performing arts from Northeastern Illinois University. and went on to earn a fellowship degree from the University of Illinois School Of Public Health. In 2011, she completed the Senior Executives in State and Local Government Program at Harvard Kennedy School.

She worked as Chief of Staff to State Representative John Cullerton before becoming a fund-raiser for progressive causes.

Illinois House of Representatives
Feigenholtz was elected to her first term as state representative of Illinois’ 12th District in 1994, defeating long-standing incumbent Ellis B. Levin.  She chose to focus her attention on health care and human services reform. She was a lead sponsor of the Family Health Care Bill.  She also campaigned for the introduction of the All Kids program.

In 2010, she sponsored the Original Birth Certificate Access Bill. This law provides for the release of the original birth certificate to an adopted person upon written request, provided he or she is over the age of 21.

As part of the Affordable Care Act implementation, Feigenholtz sponsored the 2013 expansion of Medicaid in Illinois. This legislation extended coverage to thousands of Illinoisans who were shut out of the health care system.

In 2017, Feigenholtz sponsored House Bill 40 in the 100th General Assembly, which will keep abortion legal in Illinois if Roe v. Wade is overturned by the Supreme Court of the United States. It also extends insurance coverage of abortion to state employees and women insured through Medicaid.

Sara Feigenholtz served as Assistant Majority Leader from 2013 through 2019. She currently chairs the Adoption & Child Welfare Committee, and most recently served on the Appropriations-Human Services, Tourism, Hospitality and Craft, Mental Health, Environment, and Energy Committees.

In 2018, Democrat J.B. Pritzker appointed Feigenholtz a member of the gubernatorial transition's Healthy Children and Families Committee.

Special congressional election
Feigenholtz came in third place to Mike Quigley in the Illinois's 5th congressional district special election, 2009 to fill the district seat vacated by Rahm Emanuel, who resigned to serve as President Barack Obama's Chief of Staff.

Illinois Senate 
Feigenholtz assumed the office of State Senator for Illinois' 6th District on January 21, 2020.

Feigenholtz was a guest of U.S Representative Mike Quigley at Joe Biden's 2023 State of the Union Address.

Committees 
In the 102nd General Assembly, Feigenholtz was the Chair of the Appropriations - Human Services Committee; the Tourism and Hospitality Committee; and the Redistricting - Chicago North Committee. She also served on the Senate Appropriations - Business Regulations and Labor Committee; Behavioral and Mental Health Committee; Health Committee; Insurance Committee; Licensed Activities Committee; Pensions Committee; Subcommittee on Children & Family; and the Subcommittee on Medicaid.

In the 103rd General Assembly, she is the Chair of the Financial Institutions Committee. She also serves on the Appropriations Committee; Appropriations - Health and Human Services Committee; Behavioral and Mental Health Committee; Licensed Activities Committee; and Revenue Committee.

Other
In 2001 Feigenholtz was inducted into the Chicago Gay and Lesbian Hall of Fame as a Friend of the Community.

Electoral history

References

External links

Representative Sara Feigenholtz  (D) 12th District at the Illinois General Assembly
By session: 100th, 99th, 98th, 97th, 96th, 95th, 94th, 93rd
Representative Sara Feigenholtz constituency website
Sara Feigenholtz for House Representative
 
Sara Feigenholtz  at Illinois House Democrats

1956 births
Living people
Politicians from Chicago
American adoptees
Jewish American state legislators in Illinois
Democratic Party Illinois state senators
Democratic Party members of the Illinois House of Representatives
Women state legislators in Illinois
Northeastern Illinois University alumni
University of Illinois alumni
Harvard Kennedy School alumni
21st-century American politicians
21st-century American women politicians
21st-century American Jews